Fuad Dapo Sule (born 20 January 1997) is an Irish-Nigerian professional footballer who plays as a holding midfielder for NIFL Premiership side Larne.

Early life
Born in Ibadan, Nigeria, Sule moved to the Citywest area of Dublin aged three. He was in the academy at Crumlin United before joining Shamrock Rovers aged 16.

Career
Sule joined St Patrick's Athletic in July 2014. He made his debut for the first team on the final day of the 2016 season against Derry City. This was his only appearance for the Saints before joining Bohemians in December 2016. Sule won the League of Ireland Premier Division player of the month for July 2017. Sule won the Player of the Year award for Bohemians and the League of Ireland Young Player of the Year award for 2017. His transfer to Barnet went through on 1 January 2018 for an undisclosed fee. Sule made his debut as a substitute against Crawley Town on 13 January 2018, but made no further appearances for the Bees for the rest of the season and joined NIFL Championship side Larne on loan on 3 September 2018. Sule joined Larne permanently on a two-and-a-half year deal on 31 January 2019. He received the club's most man of the match awards in the 2018–19 season and established himself as a firm fans favourite with his all action style.

Style of play
Sule played as a striker and attacking midfielder as a schoolboy, before switching to a defensive midfield role at St Pat's. His style of play been compared to N'Golo Kanté.

Personal life
Sule's brother Ajibola (born 1992) is also a footballer, having played for Shelbourne and Cabinteely, as well as his cousin Ismahil Akinade who has played for Bray Wanderers, Bohemians, Waterford and Ho Chi Minh City.

Career statistics

Honours
Larne
NIFL Championship: 2018-19
County Antrim Shield: (3) 2020-21, 2021-22, 2022-23 

Individual
NIFL Championship Team of the Year 2018-19

References

External links
Fuad Sule
16. KEITH BUCKLEY | Bohemian FC

1997 births
Living people
People from Ibadan
Sportspeople from Ibadan
Association footballers from Dublin (city)
Nigerian footballers
Republic of Ireland association footballers
Nigerian emigrants to Ireland
Association football midfielders
Crumlin United F.C. players
Shamrock Rovers F.C. players
St Patrick's Athletic F.C. players
Bohemian F.C. players
Barnet F.C. players
Larne F.C. players
League of Ireland players
English Football League players
NIFL Premiership players
Expatriate footballers in England